Soleyman Darab-e Bala (also Romanized as Soleymān Dārāb-e Bālā; also known as Soleymān Dārāb, Soliman Darab, Sulaimān Darāb, and Sulayman-Darab) is a village in Lakan Rural District, in the Central District of Rasht County, Gilan Province, Iran. At the 2006 census, its population was 222, in 61 families.

References 

Populated places in Rasht County